The Annunciation Greek Orthodox Church is a Greek Orthodox church on Manhattan's Upper West Side  at West End Avenue and West 91st Street.

History

The church was built by Heins & LaFarge in (1893–94) as the Fourth Presbyterian Church. The church was sold to a Greek parish in 1952.

Architecture

The rusticated masonry façade with a sparing use of Venetian Gothic and Richardsonian Romanesque details and the square corner bell tower with a crenellated parapet embellished with gargoyle gutter-spouts reveal Richardson's training.  Fine stained glass may be from Tiffany studios, or may be by John LaFarge, the architect's father, which would make them even rarer.

See also
Annunciation Greek Orthodox Church (Milwaukee), in Wisconsin, designed by Frank Lloyd Wright

References

External links
Parish web site

Churches completed in 1894
20th-century Eastern Orthodox church buildings
Gothic Revival church buildings in New York City
Churches in Manhattan
West End Avenue
Upper West Side
Greek Orthodox churches in New York City
Former Presbyterian churches in New York City
Heins and LaFarge buildings